The tornado outbreak sequence of May 21–26, 2011 was one of the largest tornado outbreaks on record which affected the Midwestern and Southern regions of the United States. Most of the tornadoes developed in a corridor from Lake Superior southwest to central Texas; isolated tornadoes occurred in other areas. An especially destructive tornado destroyed one-third of Joplin, Missouri, resulting in 158 deaths and over 1,000 injuries. The Joplin tornado is the deadliest in the U.S. since April 9, 1947, when an intense tornado killed 181 in the Woodward, Oklahoma area. Tornado-related deaths also occurred in Arkansas, Kansas, Minnesota, and Oklahoma. Overall, the tornado outbreak resulted in 186 deaths, 8 of those non-tornadic, making it second only to the 2011 Super Outbreak as the deadliest since 1974, and the second costliest tornado outbreak in U.S. history behind that same April 2011 outbreak, with insured damage estimated at $4–7 billion.

Meteorological synopsis
April 2011 was the most active month for tornadoes on record, capped by a very large tornado outbreak (the largest on record) that killed 324 people in the final week. In contrast, the first three weeks of May were remarkably quiet; only a few isolated tornadoes were confirmed. However, this pattern changed abruptly as a strong low-pressure area, associated dry line and cold front tracked eastward.

On May 21, a small system of thunderstorms developed in Brown County, Kansas while another system formed to the southeast of Emporia, Kansas. The Brown county system spawned a brief tornado over Topeka, Kansas, causing minor damage. This system also caused significant damage in Oskaloosa, Kansas, and other communities. Meanwhile, the Emporia system spawned an EF3 tornado that struck Reading, Kansas; one person was killed, several others were injured, and at least 20 houses were destroyed. These two systems developed several other tornadoes throughout the evening.

A moderate risk of severe weather was issued for much of the Midwest, as well as further south to Oklahoma for May 22. The first tornadic supercell developed in the mid-afternoon hours over the western Twin Cities in Minnesota, and caused moderate damage in the Minneapolis area. Shortly thereafter, an intense tornado crept towards Harmony, Minnesota, prompting the National Weather Service to issue the first tornado emergency of the outbreak. Late that afternoon, a large, intense EF5 multiple-vortex tornado left catastrophic destruction in Joplin, Missouri. Causing 158 fatalities, it was the deadliest single tornado in the U.S. since at least 1947.

Once again, a moderate risk of severe weather was issued on May 23—this time for the southern Plains and the lower Great Lakes. Forecasts showed that the main threats would be damaging wind and large hail instead of frequent tornadoes; the stationary front lacked the necessary wind shear to sustain the type of tornadic supercells seen on May 22. This prediction came to light, as only scattered, and mostly weak tornadoes were reported throughout the day. However, an EF2 tornado caused significant damage in Tennessee and Kentucky.

On May 24, a high risk of severe weather was issued for parts of south-central Kansas, central and eastern Oklahoma, and extreme north-central Texas; a moderate risk was issued for surrounding areas in those three states plus northwestern Arkansas and southwestern Missouri. Throughout this region, strong to violent tornadoes were considered to be highly probable for three reasons: (1) the stationary front was expected to maintain its position over the region, (2) wind shear was expected to greatly increase, and (3) these elements would be associated with an incoming trough. Late that morning, the tornado threat increased to 45%, a rare occurrence matching the widespread April 27 outbreak. At 12:50 p.m. CDT, the SPC issued a Particularly Dangerous Situation (PDS) tornado watch for parts of central Oklahoma, including Oklahoma City and northern Texas, in effect until 10:00 p.m. CDT. Numerous tornadoes touched down in several regions, with the first activity being in western Oklahoma that afternoon where several very intense tornadoes developed, including another EF5 (the sixth of the year). They did not cause extensive damage in Oklahoma City, but 11 deaths were reported among extensive damage just to the southwest of the OKC metro. Other tornado clusters developed in central Kansas that afternoon and in the Dallas-Fort Worth Metroplex that evening.

Once again on May 25, a high risk of severe storms was issued for the middle Mississippi River valley from near Memphis, Tennessee northward to north of Evansville, Indiana, and was expanded late that morning northward to near Indianapolis, Indiana, northwest to near St. Louis, Missouri, southeast to just west of Nashville, Tennessee and southwest to near Little Rock, Arkansas. Several hours before the outbreak was expected to begin, a PDS tornado watch was issued for western Kentucky, southern Indiana, the southern half of Illinois and eastern Missouri.  The entire state of Indiana, southern Michigan, and most of Missouri were under tornado watches. Widespread tornado activity occurred that day across the central and eastern U.S. An EF3 destroyed many homes in the town of Bedford, Indiana, and an EF2 wedge tornado caused severe damage in Sedalia, Missouri.

Tornado activity continued on May 26, but most were weak. Eight separate EF1 tornadoes touched down across Pennsylvania, and an isolated EF3 tornado destroyed multiple homes near Bush, Louisiana.

Confirmed tornadoes

Joplin, Missouri

On May 22, a large, devastating EF5 tornado tracked through Joplin, Missouri, leaving behind catastrophic damage. Mainly the southern part of the city was affected with most structures in the area either damaged or destroyed. 161 people  were killed along the  path through Jasper and Newton counties in Missouri, making it the deadliest U.S. tornado since 1947, and one of the deadliest single tornadoes ever recorded. Among the most heavily damaged structures was St. John's Hospital (pictured right), which later was torn down due to the severity of the structural damage. Damages were estimated at around $2.8 billion (2011 USD).

Hinton–El Reno–Piedmont–Guthrie, Oklahoma

Shortly after an EF3 tornado in Caddo County dissipated, this tornado began in southwestern Candian County and quickly became violent, debarking numerous trees as it passed through areas several miles southwest of Calumet. As it approached and crossed I-40 west of El Reno, it reached its maximum intensity. Only pieces of the vehicle's frames were reportedly recovered. A nearby  oil tanker truck that was parked at an oil production site near the interstate was thrown approximately  into a wooded gully. Several homes were swept completely away along I-40, trees were completely debarked, and the ground was heavily scoured in some areas. At the nearby Cactus-117 oil rig site, a  oil derrick was blown over and rolled three times. Due to the extreme nature of the damage at the Cactus-117 oil rig and along I-40, damage in that area was rated EF5. The tornado weakened slightly as it passed north of El Reno and continued northeast, producing EF3 to EF4 damage in rural areas. The tornado then reintensified and passed northwest of Piedmont as a high-end EF4, leveling multiple homes and causing additional fatalities. The Falcon Lake subdivision was particularly hard hit, and multiple homes and vehicles were swept into the lake. One home had nothing left but the foundation slab and an above ground reinforced concrete shelter sustained damage to its metal door from debris impacts. An SUV in this area was thrown  into a wooded thicket, and had its frame torn from the vehicle body, which was found crumpled around a debarked tree. The frame was twisted apart and was found nearby, along with the engine block and axles. The tornado weakened to EF3 strength as it crossed into Kingfisher County debarking trees and heavily damaging structures. The tornado then weakened further to EF2 strength, with damage confined to outbuildings and trees. Crossing into Logan County south of Cashion, the tornado reintensified slightly, producing a mixture of EF2 and EF3 damage as large high-tension towers were toppled and manufactured homes were destroyed. Frame homes were left with only interior rooms standing in this area, and two people who were caught outside during the tornado were killed. The tornado then rapidly weakened, causing EF0 to EF1 damage along the north side of Guthrie before dissipating.

This was the first EF5 tornado to strike Oklahoma since 1999, when an F5 tornado killed 36 people in and around southern and central parts of the Oklahoma City metropolitan area. Another intense EF3 tornado struck the El Reno area two years later on May 31, 2013 and also struck several storm chasers, three of whom were killed, in addition to a local resident that was following the storm and four other people. A QLCS EF3 tornado also struck the town on May 25, 2019, killing two people.

Chickasha–Blanchard–Newcastle, Oklahoma

As the EF5 El Reno–Piedmont tornado dissipated on the evening of the 24th, a separate supercell thunderstorm produced another violent tornado further to the south in Grady County.

The tornado touched down along the southwest side of Chickasha as a narrow cone shaped tornado, initially causing EF0 damage to roofs, trees, and fences. Continuing northeastward across the south side of town, the tornado reached EF2 strength as it struck a mobile home park, killing one person at that location. A car wash, automotive shop, gas station, and car dealership were damaged nearby. Several apartment buildings and a strip mall sustained major structural damage as the tornado exited town. The tornado destroyed outbuildings, snapped trees, and tossed farming equipment as it crossed US 62 east of town. After crossing the highway, the tornado began to rapidly grow in size and intensity, reaching EF3 strength as homes lost their exterior walls and trees were debarked nearby. Several metal buildings and homes were destroyed at EF2 to EF3 strength along the south side of Friend Road. The tornado crossed the road and became large and wedge-shaped, reaching EF4 intensity, scouring the ground to bare soil, debarking trees, and leveling homes, one of which was reduced to a bare slab (though this home was nailed rather than bolted to its foundation). Several vehicles were thrown hundreds of yards nearby, including an SUV that was carried 300 yards and crumpled into a ball. The tornado maintained EF4 strength crossed E1340 Road further to the northeast, reducing two well-built homes to rubble and destroying two nearby metal buildings. Many trees were debarked in this area, and a mixture of scoured crops, mud, and straw was found piled up to a depth of 6 feet against a nearby fence line. A third home sustained collapse of its exterior walls. Further along the path, another well-built home was flattened at EF4 strength, a metal building was destroyed, and vehicles were thrown up to 300 yards away along Ballard Road before the violent tornado tore across a series of open fields further to the northeast, leaving behind a continuous swath of debarked trees and scoured grass. An oil pump jack was also destroyed in this area. The tornado weakened momentarily as it passed to the northwest of the Indian Ridge Golf Course, producing only EF1 tree damage. The tornado re-intensified as it crossed NW 25th Street, completely debarking numerous trees and obliterating several metal buildings, outbuildings, and mobile homes. Several vehicles parked near a residence along N2980 Road were thrown up to 400 yards away, some of which were wrapped around trees or stripped down to their frames, and severe ground scouring occurred in this area. Numerous homes were heavily damaged or destroyed in a nearby semi-rural subdivision, one of which was leveled at EF4 intensity.

The tornado then crossed into McClain County, tearing through residential areas along the north edge of Blanchard. According to NWS damage surveyors, the tornado shrunk and tightened to "plausibly EF5 strength" as it approached and crossed Kitty Hawk Road, scouring away a large area of pavement. Sections of asphalt were gouged out by high-velocity debris impacts further along the road, and nearby trees were reduced to completely debarked stumps. As the now narrow, but very intense tornado ripped through the front lawn of a nearby house, all grass and several inches of topsoil was scoured away in a narrow swath. Several homes were reduced to bare slabs in this area, and vehicles were thrown up to 600 yards away, including a pickup truck that was torn into multiple pieces. Due to intensity of the damage in this area, surveyors noted that the tornado was "plausibly EF5" as it clipped the north side of Blanchard, though the fact that the homes swept away were missing some of their anchor bolt washers led to a high-end EF4 rating being assigned instead. Just to the northeast, the tornado maintained its strength as it struck a steel-reinforced concrete dome home, which was shredded by flying debris and sustained partial cracking of its frame. Asphalt was scoured from the home's paved driveway. The tornado then weakened to EF3 strength as it crossed Sandrock Road, debarking trees and heavily damaging or destroying several homes in nearby subdivisions. Several cars were blown out from underneath a nearby overpass and mangled. The tornado weakened further as it passed southeast of Newcastle, with mainly tree and power pole damage noted in that area. Additional minor damage to trees, power lines, and outbuildings occurred as the tornado crossed into Cleveland County, executing a loop in a field before dissipating just west of Moore.

This tornado followed a similar path to that of the May 1999 Bridge Creek–Moore tornado.

Bradley–Washington–Goldsby, Oklahoma

During the evening of May 24th, this narrow but violent EF4 tornado caused major damage in rural parts of Grady and McClain Counties at the same time another violent tornado from a separate supercell storm was devastating areas in and around Chickasha and Blanchard.

The tornado touched down west of Bradley, causing EF0 to EF1 tree damage as it crossed SH-19. Continuing to the northeast, the tornado intensified further to EF3 strength as it passed through rural areas of Grady County, snapping and debarking numerous trees. An extensive swath of ground scouring began as the tornado crossed into McClain County. The tornado then reached EF4 strength as it crossed SH-76, leveling and sweeping away several well-built homes. Vehicles were thrown long distances and mangled almost beyond recognition nearby. The tornado weakened and narrowed as it crossed CR 410, with EF2 to EF3-strength damage occurring in that area. The tornado re-intensified to EF4 strength further to the northeast as it passed between Dibble and Washington. Numerous well-built homes were leveled in that area, and some were swept completely away. Unusual cycloidal debris impact scars were noted in open fields as well. One well-built home in this area with numerous anchor bolts was reduced to a bare slab, though a metal fence immediately next to the house remained standing and grass on the property was not scoured. Another home that was reduced to a bare slab in this area had anchor bolts spaced every two feet (well above the standard of anchoring required for an EF5 rating), though a closer inspection of the home site revealed that a large mobile home frame had smashed into the house during the tornado, and a jacuzzi found in the rubble behind the house was still in usable condition. Due to these contextual discrepancies, damage in this area was rated high-end EF4 rather than EF5. The tornado curved sharply to the north and weakened to EF3 strength as it continued north of Washington, though one final area of EF4 damage occurred southwest of Goldsby as a large, well-built home was completely swept away with only the slab remaining, and large metal storage tanks behind the house were tossed. This home was specifically engineered to be tornado resistant, though close inspection of the foundation revealed that some of the anchor bolt washers were missing, and the ones that were present were slightly too small, preventing a rating higher than EF4. Further to the north, minor EF0 damage occurred near David Jay Perry Airport before the tornado dissipated. Large amounts of debris from this tornado reportedly fell from the sky in Norman.

Despite the presence of multiple well-built, anchor-bolted homes being swept completely away along the path, the tornado was not rated EF5 due to several contextual discrepancies and minor anchoring flaws. A high-end EF4 rating was applied as a result. Despite this, much like the Chickasha–Blanchard tornado, the EF4 rating is disputed, and the tornado is suspected by some to have been an EF5.

Etna–Denning–Centerpoint–Bethlehem–Harmony, Arkansas

During the overnight hours of May 24–25, a very large and violent low-end EF4 wedge tornado tracked through several small communities in western Arkansas.

The tornado touched down at 11:53 pm CDT as an EF1 south of Branch in Franklin County, snapping trees and power poles and damaging a mobile home. Some of the homes were well-built, but were left with only a small amount of debris on their foundations. Several trees were debarked, power poles were snapped, outbuildings were destroyed, and the ground was scarred by debris impacts. One person in Etna was killed, and 6 others were seriously injured. Past Etna, the tornado destroyed a very well-built steel-frame home, leaving only interior walls standing. The structure was not entirely flattened, though a low-end EF4 rating was applied due to how well-constructed the house was. The tornado then intensified to EF3 strength, and once again crossed back into Franklin County, striking the town of Denning. Numerous homes and mobile homes were destroyed in Denning, many trees and power poles were snapped, and large 100-foot tall metal high-tension poles were bent to the ground. Two people were killed in town and 11 others were injured. The tornado then continued into Johnson County and weakened to EF2 strength, heavily damaging several homes in Centerpoint, and downing numerous trees in the community cemetery. The tornado then struck the community of Bethlehem, where frame homes were damaged, mobile homes were destroyed, and one person was killed. Continuing through the Harmony community, the tornado damaged multiple residences, barns, chicken houses, and outbuildings before continuing into the Ozark National Forest and dissipating southeast of Rosetta at 12:06 am CDT.

Impacts

May 24 event

Closures and cancellations 
In advance of the day's severe weather the University of Oklahoma suspended classes in the afternoon for all three of its campuses.  American Airlines canceled 126 flights at Dallas-Fort Worth International Airport, and as the tornado outbreak progressed near Oklahoma City operations were suspended at Will Rogers World Airport.

Political response 
Governor of Oklahoma Mary Fallin declared a state of emergency in 68 counties on May 24, before taking to the air to survey damage in a number of areas. On May 29, Governor Fallin requested that the White House issue a federal major disaster declaration for seven of the 68 Oklahoma counties, and on June 6 President Obama approved Governor Fallin’s request for federal disaster relief.

Non-tornadic events
At least three people were killed in the Atlanta metropolitan area as a result of straight-line winds on the evening of May 26, likely due to a downburst.

See also
 List of F5 and EF5 tornadoes
 List of North American tornadoes and tornado outbreaks
 List of tornadoes hitting downtown areas of large cities
 Tornadoes of 2011

References

External links
 
 
 
 

F5 tornadoes by date
Tornadoes in Arkansas
Tornadoes in Indiana
Tornadoes in Iowa
Tornadoes in Kansas
Tornadoes in Louisiana
Tornadoes in Minnesota
Tornadoes in Missouri
Tornadoes in Oklahoma
Tornadoes in Tennessee
Tornadoes in Texas
Tornadoes in Wisconsin
05–21
Tornado,2011-05-21
Tornado outbreaks
2011 in Oklahoma
Tornado Outbreak